Rita Ann Higgins (born 1955) is an  Irish poet and playwright.

Early life
A native of Ballybrit, Galway, Higgins was one of thirteen children in a working-class household. She went to Briarhill National School, and Sisters of Mercy Convent, Galway. She married in 1973 but following the birth of her second child in 1977, contracted tuberculosis, forcing her to spend an extended period in a sanatorium.

While confined, she began reading, and took to composing poems. She joined the Galway Writers' Workshop in 1982. Jessie Lendennie, editor of Salmon Publishing, encouraged Higgins and oversaw the publication of her first five collections.

Career
Higgins was Galway County's Writer-in-Residence in 1987, Writer in Residence at the National University of Ireland, Galway, in 1994–95, Writer in Residence for Offaly County Council in 1998–99. She was Green Honors Professor at Texas Christian University, in October 2000. Other awards include a Peadar O'Donnell Award in 1989, several Arts Council bursaries 'Sunny Side Plucked' was a Poetry Book Society Recommendation. She was made an honorary fellow at Hong Kong Baptist University November 2006.

Personal life
Higgins is a member of Aosdána, though the group turned her down five times previously. She cites the feminist, Mary Wollstonecraft, and the Irish Republican, Mary MacSwiney, as role models. She lives in Galway and An Spidéal.

Selected works

Poetry
 Goddess on the Mervue Bus, Salmon Poetry, 1986
 Witch in the Bushes, Salmon Poetry, 1988
 Goddess and Witch, Salmon Poetry, 1990
 Philomena's Revenge, Salmon Poetry, 1992
 Higher Purchase, Salmon Poetry, 1996
 Sunny Side Plucked: New & Selected Poems, Bloodaxe Books, 1996
 An Awful Racket, Bloodaxe Books, 2001
 Throw in the Vowels: New & Selected Poems, Bloodaxe Books, 2005; 2nd edition 2010 with audio CD
 Hurting God: Prose & Poems, Salmon Poetry, 2010
 Ireland Is Changing Mother, Bloodaxe Books, 2011
 Tongulish, Bloodaxe Books, 2016
 Our Killer City, Salmon Poetry, 2018
 Pathogens Love a Patsy - Pandemic and Other Poems, Salmon Poetry, 2020

Plays
 Face Licker Come Home, 1991
 God of the Hatch Man, 1992
 Colie Lally Doesn't Live in a Bucket, 1993
 Down All the Roundabouts, 1999
 The Empty Frame, 2008
 The Plastic Bag, 2008
 The Empty Frame, 2008
 The Colossal Longing of Julie Connors, 2014

Screenplay
 The Big Break, 2004Straois/The Smirk'', 2018

See also
 Ó hUiginn

References

Further reading
 http://www.pgil-eirdata.org/html/pgil_datasets/authors/h/Higgins,RA/life.htm
 http://www.ritaannhiggins.com/profile.html

External links
 Video readings in the Irish Poetry Reading Archive, UCD Digital Library, University College Dublin
Stuart A. Rose Manuscript, Archives, and Rare Book Library, Emory University: Rita Ann Higgins papers, 1968-2017

1955 births
Living people
Aosdána members
Irish women poets
People from County Galway
Irish women dramatists and playwrights
20th-century Irish dramatists and playwrights
20th-century Irish poets
21st-century Irish dramatists and playwrights
21st-century Irish poets
20th-century Irish women writers
21st-century Irish women writers